Ptychomnion is a genus of mosses belonging to the family Ptychomniaceae.

The species of this genus are found in Australia and South America.

Species:
 Ptychomnion aciculare Mitten, 1869
 Ptychomnion cygnisetum Kindberg, 1888

References

Ptychomniales
Moss genera